Galinthias amoena is a species of praying mantis found in sub-Saharan Africa.

See also
List of mantis genera and species

References

Galinthiadidae
Mantodea of Africa
Fauna of Zimbabwe
Insects of Tanzania
Insects of Cameroon
Insects of Malawi
Insects of West Africa
Insects described in 1871